Hokuzan Dam is a concrete gravity dam located in Saga Prefecture in Japan. The dam is used for agriculture and power production. The catchment area of the dam is 54.6 km2. The dam impounds about 200  ha of land when full and can store 22250 thousand cubic meters of water. The construction of the dam was started on 1950 and completed in 1956.

References

Dams in Saga Prefecture
1956 establishments in Japan